Radcliff is an unincorporated community in Vinton County, in the U.S. state of Ohio.

History
Radcliff was founded 1879, and named for John Radcliff, the original owner of the town site. A post office was established at Radcliff in 1880, and remained in operation until 1994.

References

Unincorporated communities in Vinton County, Ohio
Unincorporated communities in Ohio